Haacht is a municipality located in the Belgian province of Flemish Brabant. The municipality comprises the towns of Haacht proper, Kelfs, Tildonk, Wakkerzeel and Wespelaar.

On January 1, 2020, Haacht had a total population of 14,858. The total area is 30.57 km2 which gives a population density of 483 inhabitants per km2.

Attractions 
Special attractions in Haacht are:
 The church St.-Remigius, of which some walls still date the original construction from the year 1281.
 The Anti-Tank canal, a defensive line built in 1939 as part of the K-W Line, to protect against German attack. It proved ineffective, as the invading Germans took a wide detour around it. In 1997 the nature preservation group  made it a protected natural area.
 The brewery of Haacht, the biggest Belgian brewery that is still in Belgian ownership and the third Belgian brewery regarding marketshare. The brewery is named after the municipality of Haacht but is actually located within the borders of neighbouring municipality Boortmeerbeek.
 The new sporting facilities 'Den Dijk', opened in 2003, with a separate gymnastics hall.
 It also has the nearest train station in its surroundings: Haacht Railway Station.

Municipal government
Haacht has a city council of 23 members.

Transport
Haacht has three railway stops: Haacht, Wespelaar-Tildonk and Hambos.

References

External links
 
Official website - Only available in Dutch
Haachtse Geschied- en Oudheidkundige Kring - Only available in Dutch
Haacht Brewery

Municipalities of Flemish Brabant